Yates Tavern, also known as Yancy Cabin, is a historic tavern located near Gretna, Pittsylvania County, Virginia. The building dates to the late-18th or early-19th century, and is a two-story, frame building sheathed in weatherboard.  It measures approximately 18 feet by 24 feet and has eight-inch jetty on each long side at the second-floor level.  It is representative of a traditional hall-and-parlor Tidewater house.  The building was occupied by a tavern in the early-19th century.  It was restored in the 1970s.

It was listed on the National Register of Historic Places in 1974.

References

External links
 Yates Tavern - Pittsylvania County Historical Society

Research on Yates Tavern history and family graves on location, by Dail Yeatts. Book sources listed: https://www.mitchellspublications.com/ur/loc/yeattssd/001.pdf
Yates Family Cemetery, location map and coordiinates: http://www.yatesville.net/tngrey/showmap.php?cemeteryID=643&tree=

Historic American Buildings Survey in Virginia
Drinking establishments on the National Register of Historic Places in Virginia
Buildings and structures in Pittsylvania County, Virginia
National Register of Historic Places in Pittsylvania County, Virginia